Cassinia uncata, commonly known as sticky cassinia, is a species of flowering plant in the family Asteraceae and is native to inland New South Wales and the south-east of South Australia. It is an erect shrub with hairy young stems, narrow linear to needle-shaped leaves, and heads of off-white to cream-coloured flowers arranged in rounded, almost conical panicles.

Description
The leaf upper surface of the leaves is wrinkled and slightly sticky, the edges are rolled under, the lower surface is densely woolly-hairy and there is a hooked tip on the end. Between 25 and 150 heads are arranged in more or less conical panicles along the branches.

Taxonomy and naming
Cassinia uncata was first formally described  in 1838 by Augustin Pyramus de Candolle from an unpublished description by Allan Cunningham and the description was published in Prodromus Systematis Naturalis Regni Vegetabilis. The specific epithet (uncata) means "hooked" or "bent inwards".

Distribution and habitat
This cassinia grows in woodland, mallee and scrub on the western slopes and plains of inland New South Wales and the south-east of South Australia.

References

uncata
Asterales of Australia
Flora of New South Wales
Flora of South Australia
Plants described in 1838
Taxa named by Augustin Pyramus de Candolle